Brooke Scullion (born 31 March 1999), sometimes performing under the mononym Brooke, is an Irish singer. She was a contestant on series 9 of The Voice UK, finishing in third place. She represented Ireland in the Eurovision Song Contest 2022 with the song "That's Rich".

Early life 
Scullion was born on 31 March 1999 in Bellaghy, County Londonderry, Northern Ireland. She was involved in both the performing arts and sports from a young age. In secondary school, she performed in several musical productions including Fame, Mamma Mia!, and Sister Act. She played on the senior camogie team at Wolfe Tones GAC.

She was a drama student at Ulster University at Magee.

Career

2020: The Voice UK 
In 2020, she auditioned for the ninth series of The Voice UK. In the blind auditions, she earned chair turns from all four coaches and chose Meghan Trainor to be her coach. She finished in third place.

2022: Eurovision Song Contest 
In January 2022, Brooke was announced as one of six finalists competing in Eurosong 2022, the national final for Ireland to decide its representative for the Eurovision Song Contest 2022. With her song "That's Rich", Brooke won Eurosong 2022 with twenty-eight points. She won by four points over "Ashes of Yesterday" by Janet Grogan and "Yeah, We're Gonna Get Out of It" by Miles Graham. She received twelve points each from the international jury and televote, and four points from the jury in the studio. She represented Ireland in the Eurovision Song Contest 2022 in Turin, Italy and performed in position 10 in the second semi-final on 12 May. However, Scullion failed to qualify for the final.

Dancing with the Stars
From January to March 2023, Scullion was a contestant in the sixth series of Dancing with the Stars.
 She was originally partnered with Maurizio Benenato, however, in week 3, Benenato had to leave the show citing personal reasons. Scullion's partner since then has been Robert Rowiński.

She received 25 points (8+8+9, from Brian, Lorraine and Arthur, respectively) in week one, a record score for week one of Irish Dancing With The Stars.

In week 8 of the competition, she received the first 30 (10+10+10, from Brian, Lorraine and Arthur, respectively) of the series.

Personal life
Outside of singing, Brooke works as a personal assistant to an estate agent in Toome, County Antrim.

Discography

Extended Plays 
 Chaotic Heart (2022)

Singles

References

External links

1999 births
21st-century women singers from Northern Ireland
Eurovision Song Contest entrants of 2022
Eurovision Song Contest entrants for Ireland
Living people
People from County Londonderry
Pop singers from Northern Ireland